William Van Buren (June 29, 1935 – March 10, 2007) was an American Negro league pitcher for the Kansas City Monarchs in 1953.

A native of Fulton, Missouri, Van Buren played one season with the Monarchs prior to enrolling in Lincoln University in 1953. He later served in the US Air Force for 13 years. 
 
Van Buren died in Fulton in 2007 at age 71.

References

External links
 William Van Buren at Negro Leagues Baseball Museum

1935 births
2007 deaths
Kansas City Monarchs players
20th-century African-American sportspeople
Baseball pitchers
21st-century African-American people